The University of Huelva is a public university in Huelva, Spain. It was founded in 1993.

The university offers undergraduate degrees, postgraduate degrees, and doctoral programs across a wide range of fields, including arts and humanities, engineering and technology, health sciences, natural sciences, and social sciences.

References

University of Huelva
Educational institutions established in 1993
1993 establishments in Spain
Huelva